Sarah M. "Sally" Zack-Endestad (born November 1, 1962) is a road cyclist from United States. She represented her nation at the 1988 Summer Olympics in the women's road race and at the 1992 Summer Olympics in the women's road race.

She is the wife of Norwegian-born American Olympic cross country skier Audun Endestad.

References

External links
 profile at sports-reference.com

1962 births
Living people
American female cyclists
Cyclists at the 1992 Summer Olympics
Cyclists at the 1988 Summer Olympics
Olympic cyclists of the United States
People from North Conway, New Hampshire
Sportspeople from Carroll County, New Hampshire
21st-century American women
Cyclists from New Hampshire